Harry Dominic Chiti (born December 10, 1958 in Independence, Missouri) is an American former professional baseball player, coach, scout and farm system official. In Major League Baseball, he has worked as bullpen coach of the Cleveland Indians, Baltimore Orioles, Texas Rangers, and Los Angeles Angels. He is a former left-handed pitcher in the minor leagues.

Playing career
Dom Chiti was born in Independence, Missouri, the son of former major league catcher Harry Chiti. An All-America team member, Chiti was a second round selection of the Atlanta Braves in the 1976 draft out of Raleigh-Egypt High School, Memphis, Tennessee. He started his professional career with the Kingsport Braves in 1976, and the following year he was named to the Western Carolinas League All-Star team as a member of the Class A Greenwood Braves. But he suffered serious arm problems late in the 1978 season, and never rose higher than the Double-A level. After leaving the Atlanta system, Chiti also played in the Orioles' organization in 1981 before retiring as a player.

Coaching career
Chiti started his coaching career in 1982 with the Texas Rangers organization. He also worked as a coach or a scout in the Baltimore and Cleveland systems, and coached in the Venezuelan Winter League in 1995 for Caribes team. Chiti returned to the Rangers in 2002. After serving as a special assistant to the general manager in 2002-2003, the next two years he served as director of player personnel. 2006 marked his first season as the Rangers bullpen coach.

In October 2006, the Texas Rangers signed Ron Washington as their new manager for the 2007 season. Washington kept Chiti as the bullpen coach, as well hitting coach Rudy Jaramillo and pitching coach Mark Connor. Former Oakland manager Art Howe joined the staff as bench coach, although his contract was not renewed at the end of the disappointing 2008 season.

Chiti was also a special assistant to Atlanta Braves GM Frank Wren however on November 8, 2013 he was hired as bullpen coach for the Baltimore Orioles replacing interim coach Scott McGregor.

In 2019 he returned to the Braves to replace Dave Trembley as director of player development, but was reassigned in December of the same year.

References

External links

Atlanta Braves 1976 draft picks
MLB.com
Texas Rangers news

1958 births
Living people
Atlanta Braves scouts
Baltimore Orioles coaches
Cleveland Indians coaches
Cleveland Indians scouts
Durham Bulls players
Greenwood Braves players
Hagerstown Suns players
Kingsport Braves players
Major League Baseball bullpen catchers
Major League Baseball bullpen coaches
Major League Baseball scouts
Sportspeople from Independence, Missouri
Savannah Braves players
Texas Rangers coaches
Texas Rangers executives